USS Kewaydin may refer to:

Kewaydin, a screw steamer, was laid down at Boston Navy Yard in 1864. but her hull was never completed. Renamed Pennsylvania 15 May 1869, she was broken up in 1884
, formally the Kickapoo was renamed Keywadin on 10 August 1869. Some texts publish this ship under the name Kewaydin
, was a tugboat, commissioned on 4 November 1919 and decommissioned 10 December 1945

Keywadin